The 1940 United States House of Representatives elections in Virginia were held on November 5, 1940 to determine who will represent the Commonwealth of Virginia in the United States House of Representatives. Virginia had nine seats in the House, apportioned according to the 1930 United States Census. Representatives are elected for two-year terms.

Overview

References

See also
 1940 United States House of Representatives elections
 1940 United States Senate election in Virginia

Virginia
1940
1940 Virginia elections